Ellen Nan Junn is an American academic administrator. In July 2016, she became the 11th president of California State University, Stanislaus. She is the first Korean-American woman president appointed in the U.S. to a four-year public institution.

Early life and education 
Junn was born in Champaign, Illinois, the daughter of immigrants from Korea. She was raised in Jenison, Michigan.

Junn earned a bachelor's degree in experimental and cognitive psychology from the University of Michigan. She earned a master's degree and PhD in cognitive and developmental psychology from Princeton University. In addition, she holds a management development program certificate from Harvard University, and CSU-Knight Collaborative program certificate from Wharton School of the University of Pennsylvania Institute for Research in Higher Education.

Career 
Junn has worked at California State University for 33 years, working at five other CSU campuses prior to joining Stanislaus. She began her career as an assistant psychology professor at California State University, San Bernardino. She has also taught and held leadership positions at the Dominguez Hills, San Jose State, Fresno and Fullerton campuses. She has led initiatives such as the African American Student Success and Hispanic Student Success task force at San Jose State and the Women’s Campus Connection and the Asian Faculty and Staff Association at California State Fresno.

Junn is widely published and has peer-reviewed research and journal articles. She also has numerous community leadership roles and has worked as an academic professor.

Personal life  
Junn is married to Allan Greenberg, with whom she has one son.

References 

Year of birth missing (living people)
Living people
University of Michigan College of Literature, Science, and the Arts alumni
California State University, Stanislaus faculty
Women heads of universities and colleges
California State University, San Bernardino faculty
California State University, Dominguez Hills faculty
San Jose State University faculty
California State University, Fullerton faculty
California State University, Fresno faculty
Princeton University alumni
American academics of Korean descent
People from Champaign, Illinois
People from Jenison, Michigan